Oliver Johnston may refer to:

 Ollie Johnston (1912–2008), American film animator
 Oliver Johnston (actor) (1888–1966), English actor

See also  
 Oliver Johnson (disambiguation)